Subsurface may refer to:
 Bedrock, consolidated rock beneath a planet's surface
 Subsurface (album), 2004 album by British band Threshold
 Subsurface (software), divelog software
A subdivision surface ("subsurf") in 3D computer graphics

See also